This is the results breakdown of the local elections held in Castile and León on 8 May 1983. The following tables show detailed results in the autonomous community's most populous municipalities, sorted alphabetically.

Overall

City control
The following table lists party control in the most populous municipalities, including provincial capitals (shown in bold). Gains for a party are displayed with the cell's background shaded in that party's colour.

Municipalities

Ávila
Population: 40,173

Burgos
Population: 152,545

León
Population: 127,095

Palencia
Population: 71,716

Ponferrada
Population: 53,763

Salamanca
Population: 153,981

Segovia
Population: 50,759

Soria
Population: 30,326

Valladolid
Population: 320,293

Zamora
Population: 58,560

See also
1983 Castilian-Leonese regional election

References

Castile and León
1983